Joanikije II (1337– d. 1354) was the Serbian Archbishop (1338–1346) and first Serbian Patriarch (1346–1354). He was elected Serbian Archbishop on January 3, 1338. Prior to his election, he served as a logotet, royal chancellor, to the Kingdom of Serbia. He was elevated to Patriarch on Palm Sunday, April 6, 1346, done in order for Joanikije to crown King Stefan Uroš IV Dušan as Emperor on Easter of 1346 with the approval of the Patriarch of Trnovo, Archbishop of Ohrid, and community of Mount Athos. Joanikije continued a tradition of church building, and built, among others, two churches in the Holy Land: the Church of St. Elias on Mount Carmel and the Church of St. Nicholas on Mount Tabor. Joanikije died on September 3, 1354, which is his feast day. He was buried in the Patriarchal Monastery of Peć.

Life
Joanikije was born in the vicinity of Prizren, an important town in the Kingdom of Serbia. His family was Christian.

Joanikije served as a logotet, royal chancellor, to the Serbian King Stefan Uroš IV Dušan (r. 1331–1346; afterwards as Emperor until 1355).

Archbishop Danilo II died on December 19, 1337. Joanikije was elected Serbian Archbishop on January 3, 1338. He continued the Christian work of his predecessors, and had the Monastery of Peć, which was the seat of the Archbishop built by Nikodim and Danilo I, further worked on, adding icons and frescoes and other things.

King Dušan had expanded his territory into the deep Greek (Byzantine) south in the 1340s. In 1346, the king convened a regional assembly of church leaders, which declared the independence of the Serbian Church and elevated it to a Patriarchate. Joanikije was designated Patriarch on Palm Sunday, April 6, 1346, done in order for Joanikije to crown King Stefan Uroš IV Dušan as Emperor on Easter of 1346 with the approval of the Patriarch of Trnovo, Archbishop of Ohrid, and community of Mount Athos.

Joanikije II continued a tradition of church building, and built, among others, two churches in the Holy Land: the Church of St. Elias on Mount Carmel and the Church of St. Nicholas on Mount Tabor. 
 
Joanikije II died on September 3, 1354, which is his feast day. He was buried in the Patriarchal Monastery of Peć.

Annotations
Name: His name was Joanikije. His family  surname is unknown.

References

Sources

14th-century Eastern Orthodox bishops
14th-century Serbian people
Patriarchs of the Serbian Orthodox Church
Medieval chancellors (government)
People of the Serbian Empire
People from Peja
Year of birth unknown
1354 deaths
Burials at the Patriarchate of Peć (monastery)
Serbian saints of the Eastern Orthodox Church